Richard Prosser, DD (1748–1839) was  Archdeacon of Durham from 1808 until his death.

Biography 
He was the son of Humphrey Prosser of Market Drayton, and matriculated at Balliol College, Oxford in 1767, where he graduated B.A. in 1770. He was made a Fellow and graduated M.A. in 1773, B.D. in 1784, and D.D. in 1797.

Prosser served incumbencies in Colchester, Gateshead and Easington. He died on 8 October 1839.

References

Archdeacons of Durham
1748 births
1839 deaths
Alumni of Balliol College, Oxford